Katharina of Hanau (26 March 1525 – 20 August 1581) was the eldest daughter of Philipp II, Count of Hanau-Münzenberg and Countess Juliana of Stolberg.

Marriage and issue 
Katharina married in 1543 to Count Johann IV of Wied-Runkel and Isenburg (d. 15 June 1581).  In 1525, he was mentioned as a canon in Cologne; he later reverted to the lay state.  They had the following children:
 Herman I (d. 10 December 1581), succeeded his father 1581; married Countess Walpurga of Bentheim-Steinfurt
 Wilhelm (d. 1612), succeeded his father in 1581 in Runkel and Dierdorf, the so-called "Upper County of Wied"; married Countess Johanna Sibylla of Hanau-Lichtenberg
 Juliane (1545-1606), married Reichard, Count Palatine of Simmern-Sponheim
 Magdalena (d. 13 October 1606), married to Count Siegmund of Hardegg (d. 1599)
 Anna (d. 1590), married to Johann Wilhelm of Rogendorff (d. 1590)
 Katharina (27 May 1552 – 13 November 1584), married to Philipp V, Count of Hanau-Lichtenberg
 Agnes (d. 1 May 1581), married to Gottfried IV Schenk IV of Limpurg-Speckfeld-Obersontheim (d. 1581)

Ancestors

References 
 Adrian Willem Eliza Dek: De Afstammelingen van Juliana van Stolberg tot aan het jaar van de vrede van Munster, Zaltbommel, 1968
 Reinhard Suchier: Genealogie des Hanauer Grafenhauses, in: Festschrift des Hanauer Geschichtsvereins zu seiner fünfzigjährigen Jubelfeier am 27. August 1894, Hanau, 1894
Ernst J. Zimmermann: Hanau Stadt und Land, 3rd ed., Hanau, 1919, reprinted: 1978

Footnotes 

German countesses
House of Hanau
1525 births
1581 deaths
16th-century German people